Paulo César da Silva  may refer to:
Paulo da Silva (born 1980), Paraguayan football player
Giant Silva, real name Paulo César da Silva (born 1963), former basketball player, mixed martial arts fighter and wrestler